The 1922 New Mexico gubernatorial election was held on November 7, 1922. Democratic candidate James F. Hinkle defeated Republican nominee Charles Lee Hill with 54.57% of the vote.

General election

Candidates
James F. Hinkle, Democratic, businessman and former State Senator
Charles Lee Hill, Republican, dentist

Results

References

Bibliography
 
 
 

1922
New Mexico
Gubernatorial
November 1922 events